Brian Joseph Turner (29 March 1952 – 29/30 May 2010) was an Australian soccer player who played as a forward.

Club career
Turner began his football career with New Lambton in the Northern New South Wales State League. In 1969, he spent time with Tottenham in England, though he didn't play a first team match. Returning to Australia in 1971, Brian played for Western Suburbs in the New South Wales State League before transferring in April 1974 to Sydney Croatia for $3,000. A knee injury forced him to retire from football in the mid-1970s.

International career
In November 1971 he made his only appearance for Australia against Israel in Melbourne.

Post-football
After retiring from playing, Turner worked as a player agent, helping a number of young players make their way into the international football world.

Turner, who died in Canberra in May 2010 after a year long battle against cancer, was a father of two sons and one daughter.

References

1952 births
2010 deaths
Australian soccer players
Association football forwards
Australia international soccer players